Bishopstone, a place name meaning 'Bishop's estate', may refer to:

Places
England
Bishopstone, Buckinghamshire
Bishopstone, East Sussex
Bishopstone, Herefordshire
Bishopstone, Salisbury, Wiltshire
Bishopstone, Swindon, Wiltshire

People
Cyril Asquith, Baron Asquith of Bishopstone (1890–1954), English judge and law lord

See also
Bishopston (disambiguation)
Bishopton (disambiguation)